Dongcheng is a community of Chating town, Wangcheng District, Changsha. It is located on the northern margin of Wangcheng District, and the west of Chating town. the community was formed by merging the Shenjiaqiao Community and Jingshen Village on March 23, 2016. there is about a population of 4,880.

History
The present place of Dongcheng is a community of village-level administrative division, and it is also the center of west Chating town. After revocation of Dongchen town which merged to Chating on November 19, 2015, the residential community was reformed by merging Shenjiaqiao Community and Jinshen Village  March 23, 2016.

Historic Dongcheng Town 
As a historic townsip-level division, Dongcheng was formed from a portion of Tongguan commune in 1961, Dongcheng existed for about 55 years until Dongcheng Town was incorporated into Chating on November 19, 2015.

Dongcheng was the places of Tongxin and minzhu Townships in 1951, a portion of Tongguan Commune in 1958. Dongcheng Commune was formed from a portion of Tongguan Commune in 1961, it was renamed as Dongcheng Township in 1984 and changed as Dongcheng Town in 1995.

Dongcheng covered , there was 15 villages under its jurisdiction till adjustment of village-level divisions in 2005, the 15 village-level divisions were merged to seven villages and a community in 2005. There was a permanent population of 13,576 (2010 census), and a registered population of 19,028 (2012).

References

Wangcheng District
Communities of China
Wangcheng District